Estadio Olímpico Patria is a multi-purpose stadium in Sucre, capital of Bolivia.  It is currently used for football matches and is the home venue for Universitario de Sucre and Independiente Petrolero, and was used for the 1997 Copa América.  The stadium holds 30,700 and was opened in 1992.

References

Sports venues completed in 1992
Football venues in Bolivia
Copa América stadiums
Multi-purpose stadiums in Bolivia
Estadio Olímpico Patria
Sport in Sucre